Fulvoclysia aulica is a species of moth of the family Tortricidae. It is found in Armenia and Turkey.

References

Moths described in 1968
Cochylini